National Highway 3 (old number), or Old national NH 3, commonly referred to as the Agra–Bombay Road or just Agra Road in Bombay, was a major Indian National Highway that ran through the states of Uttar Pradesh, Rajasthan, Madhya Pradesh and Maharashtra in India. The national highway still exists but its various segments have been assigned new numbers as stated in the following section. 

National Highway 3A was a branch highway between Bharatpur and terminated at Dholpur, Rajasthan.

Route
The highway originated in Agra in Uttar Pradesh, generally travelled southwest through Dholpur in Rajasthan, Morena, Gwalior, Shivpuri, Guna, Biaora, Maksi, Dewas, Indore and Julwania in Madhya Pradesh, and Dhule, Malegaon, Nashik, Thane and terminated at Mumbai. The length of the old NH 3 was 1,190 km.

The stretch between Agra and Gwalior was marked as the North–South corridor by the National Highways Authority of India. After it entered Bombay, the highway was known as Eastern Express Highway. The stretch from Mumbai to Nashik became Mumbai Nashik Expressway.

Currently, the stretch between Agra and Gwalior is four-lane. The stretch from Gwalior via Shivpuri, Guna, Maksi up to Dewas road is now four-lane. The condition between Shivpuri and Maksi is newly constructed and good. Now the Condition . 

The road from Dewas to Indore is six lanes and it continues till Rau (Indore). The road from Rau (Indore) to Mumbai has four lanes but the highway passed through congested Nasik city. Now an elevated expressway of 25 km has been built to solve the problem of congestion. Stretch from Nashik to Mumbai is 4-lane Mumbai Nashik Expressway.
The stretch from Pimpalgaon Bsawant - Nashik - Gondhe is 6 Lane expressway. The stretch from Padgha to Thane 8 lane is in progress.

New NH numbers of Agra-Bombay road
After renumbering of all national highways by National Highway Authority of India in 2010, the former NH 3 has been broken into several new national highway numbers and the old NH 3 number has ceased to exist. 

 Agra - Gwalior is NH 44. 
 Gwalior - Biaora is NH 46.
 Biaora - Dhule is NH 52.
 Dhule - Nashik is NH 60.
 Nashik - Mumbra is NH 160.
 Mumbra (Reti Bunder) - Thane / Navi Mumbai is NH 48.

See also
 List of National Highways in India by highway number
 National Highways Development Project

References

External links 
 Old NH 3 on OpenStreetMap
 NH 3 on MapsofIndia

3
3
3
3
National highways in India (old numbering)
Transport in Agra
Transport in Mumbai